Screen is an academic journal of film and television studies based at the University of Glasgow and published by Oxford University Press. The editors-in-chief are Tim Bergfelder (University of Southampton), Alison Butler (University of Reading), Dimitris Eleftheriotis (University of Glasgow), Karen Lury (University of Glasgow), Alastair Phillips (University of Warwick), Jackie Stacey (University of Manchester), and Sarah Street (University of Bristol).

History 
Screen originated in the Society of Film Teachers' journal, The Film Teacher, in 1952. Soon after, the society was renamed as the Society for Education in Film and Television and its journal changed its name to Screen Education in 1960. Screen Education was renamed to Screen in 1969, although a separate journal titled Screen Education was also published.

During the 1970s, Screen was particularly influential in the nascent field of film studies. It published many articles that have become standards in the field—including Laura Mulvey's seminal work, "Visual Pleasure and Narrative Cinema" (1975). It is still highly regarded in academic circles.

Screen theory, a Marxist-psychoanalytic film theory that came to prominence in Britain in the early 1970s, took its name from Screen.

Abstracting and indexing 
The journal is abstracted and indexed in:
 Arts and Humanities Citation Index
 British Humanities Index
 Current Contents/Arts & Humanities
 FIAF International Index to Film Periodicals Plus
 MLA International Bibliography
 International Index to the Performing Arts
 Studies on Women and Gender Abstracts

See also
 List of film periodicals

References

External links 
 

Film studies journals
Television studies journals
English-language journals
University of Glasgow
Publications established in 1952
Oxford University Press academic journals